Agrasen DAV Public School, Bharechnagar, India, was launched in 1993 with the co-operation of the local Agarwal community. Shri R. N. Agarwal, philanthropist, industrialist, and Managing Director (Sri Durga Cement Company Limited, Hesla, Ramgarh Cantt) had donated 0.33 acre land to the school, that was later taken over by the DAV organization. It was inaugurated on 17 October 1993 by Shri G. P. Chopra, the then President of the DAV College Managing Committee.

The school has classes up to +2 level, and is affiliated to CBSE, New Delhi. The school has 1900 students, and an area of 3.25 acres.  Hon'ble Mohanlal, Secretary and Education Advisor, DAV College Managing Committee, New Delhi laid the foundation stone of the Mahatma Hansraj Block of the school on 10 May 2002. Now the school has a library, science labs and computer labs.

Vision and visionaries
DAV institutions are the gift of Arya Samaj, a progressive movement founded by Swami Dayanand Saraswati in 1875. To infuse in the citizens of India the ideals of Vedic Culture and a sense of patriotism. Arya Samaj founded a school at Lahore in 1886 by the name of Davanand Anglo Vedic School. This established the MV College Trust and Management Society, which set up a network of such educational institutions all over India and abroad. The DAV Movement would not have achieved its goal, had not a young brilliant graduate - Mahatma Hansraj - The first principal of the first DAV institution - offered his honorary services as Jeevan Daan', for 25 years.

It is the largest- non-government educational organization in the country, managing over 700 educational institutions.

Methods
Methods of teaching include demonstration, experimentation, projects, home assignments, play-way, and micro-teaching.

External links
Official school website
Official website of the DAV Society

References

Schools affiliated with the Arya Samaj
Educational institutions established in 1993
Private schools in Jharkhand
1993 establishments in Bihar
Memorials to Agrasen